Belmont Township, Kansas may refer to the following places:

 Belmont Township, Kingman County, Kansas
 Belmont Township, Phillips County, Kansas

See also 
 List of Kansas townships
 Belmont Township (disambiguation)

Kansas township disambiguation pages